Thomas Bruce, 2nd Earl of Ailesbury (later styled Aylesbury) and 3rd Earl of Elgin (1656 – 16 December 1741), styled Lord Bruce between 1663 and 1685, was an English politician and memoirist. He was the son of Robert Bruce, 2nd Earl of Elgin, and Lady Diana Grey. His maternal grandparents were Henry Grey, 1st Earl of Stamford, and Lady Anne Cecil, daughter of William Cecil, 2nd Earl of Exeter. His Memoirs, which were not published until long after his death, are a valuable source for English history in the last quarter of the seventeenth century.

Early life 

Lord Bruce was elected member of parliament for Marlborough between 1679 and 1681, and for Wiltshire in 1685. He became a Gentleman of the Bedchamber in 1676. From 1685, when he inherited the earldom, to 1688, he was a Lord of the Bedchamber, Lord Lieutenant of Bedfordshire and Huntingdonshire (the latter in the absence of the Earl of Sandwich) and was a Page of Honour, at the coronation of King James II on 23 April 1685. He was devoted to Charles II, who remarked on his deathbed "I see you love me dying as well as living"; Bruce wrote later of Charles' death that "Thus ended my happy days at a Court, and to this hour I bewail my loss". He also admired Charles's brother and successor James II, though he was not blind to his faults as a ruler.

Family 

He married, firstly, Lady Elizabeth Seymour, daughter of Henry Seymour, Lord Beauchamp and Mary Capell and granddaughter of William Seymour, 2nd Duke of Somerset, on 31 August 1676. She died in 1697 in premature childbirth, apparently brought on by a false report that her husband had been executed for treason. They had three children:
Robert Bruce, Lord Bruce (1679–1685)
Charles Bruce, 4th Earl of Elgin (1682–1747)
Lady Elizabeth Bruce (1689–1745), married George Brudenell, 3rd Earl of Cardigan and had issue.

He married, secondly, Charlotte d'Argenteau, comtesse d'Esneux, in Brussels (St Jacques sur Coudenberg) on 27 April 1700. They had one daughter:
Lady Marie Thérèse Bruce (1704–1736), married Prince Maximilian Emmanuel of Hornes and had issue.

Later life 

He was one of only four peers who continued to support James II after the Prince of Orange embarked for England. On 18 December 1688 he accompanied King James to Rochester when he fled London. Elgin himself chose to remain in England; he was prepared in the short term to offer his support to the new regime, although his loyalty to it was always deeply suspect.

In May 1695, Lord Elgin was accused, almost certainly with good reason, of having conspired to plan the restoration of King James II and in February 1696 he was imprisoned in the Tower of London, but admitted to bail a year later and allowed to leave England for Brussels. After more than 40 years in exile, he died in Brussels and was buried there. 

Some historians have accused him of double-dealing in swearing allegiance to William III while plotting the restoration of James; others argue that his true loyalty was to the institution of the monarchy, and that he supported whichever monarch seemed best fitted to rule at any given time. William III clearly did not regard him as a dangerous character, as shown by the fact that he was left in peace once he fled from England; he was fortunate in having a great many friends and very few enemies. It seems that from about 1710 he was free to return to England, but he was by then happily settled in Brussels, where he had made a second marriage for love to Charlotte, comtesse d'Esneux, and, since he was able to draw at least part of the revenue from his English estates, he had no pressing need and no apparent desire to return home.

Character 

Ailesbury seems to have been almost universally liked even by his political opponents, having a reputation for honesty, decency and fair dealing. Charles II was clearly fond of him and confided in him to a degree unusual for such a secretive man; James II also liked him, and Louis XIV regarded him as almost the only British nobleman who was not motivated purely by self-interest. Though he changed allegiance himself he had no patience with time-servers: he detested Sunderland (while admitting that he was good company) and in 1689 told his cousin Danby that for his treachery to James II he deserved to "be knocked on the head".

Memoirs 
Ailesbury devoted many years to writing his Memoirs, which were not published until 1890. Historians have praised them highly, particularly for the vivid portraits of the leading figures in British life, including James II, William III, Danby, Sunderland, Lauderdale and Halifax. Perhaps the most striking feature of the memoirs is the author's absolute devotion to Charles II: "my good and gracious master, the best that ever reigned over us".

Ancestry

Notes

|-

|-

|-

1656 births
1741 deaths
17th-century English nobility
18th-century English nobility
18th-century English memoirists
3
Thomas
Thomas
Lord-Lieutenants of Bedfordshire
Lord-Lieutenants of Huntingdonshire
Elgin, Thomas Bruce, 3rd Earl of
Prisoners in the Tower of London
English MPs 1679
English MPs 1680–1681
English MPs 1685–1687
Thomas